In the geologic timescale, the Middle Triassic is the second of three epochs of the Triassic period or the middle of three series in which the Triassic system is divided in chronostratigraphy. The Middle Triassic spans the time between  Ma and  Ma (million years ago). It is preceded by the Early Triassic Epoch and followed by the Late Triassic Epoch. The Middle Triassic is divided into the Anisian and Ladinian ages or stages.

Formerly the middle series in the Triassic was also known as Muschelkalk. This name is now only used for a specific unit of rock strata with approximately Middle Triassic age, found in western Europe.

Middle Triassic fauna
Following the Permian–Triassic extinction event, the most devastating of all mass-extinctions, life recovered slowly. In the Middle Triassic, many groups of organisms reached higher diversity again, such as the marine reptiles (e.g. ichthyosaurs, sauropterygians, thallatosaurs), ray-finned fish and many invertebrate groups like molluscs (ammonoids, bivalves, gastropods).

During the Middle Triassic, there were no flowering plants, but instead there were ferns and mosses.  Small dinosauriforms began to appear, like Nyasasaurus and the ichnogenus Iranosauripus.

References

GeoWhen Database - Middle Triassic

 
02
Geological epochs
02